The second Jones government (11 May 2011 – 19 May 2016) was a Labour minority government.

Having won the largest number of seats in the 2011 general election (30 out of 60) the Labour sought to form a minority government, having previously governed in coalition with Plaid Cymru. Carwyn Jones was re-elected First Minister in May 2011 and continued to serve up to and beyond the 2016 election.

During the five years of this government there were two significant reshuffles (March 2013 and September 2014) as well as two departures from the Cabinet, both of which led to widespread changes in personnel and in ministerial titles and responsibilities.

This government was the first since the 2011 referendum on primary law making powers and thus passed the first Welsh Law without the expressed consent of Westminster. The Welsh Government under Carwyn Jones also purchased and nationalised Cardiff Airport during this period.

Cabinet

Junior Ministers

Changes 

A significant reshuffle occurred on 8 March 2013, in which Mark Drakeford entered the cabinet as Health Minister.

Following the resignation of Leighton Andrews from the cabinet in June 2103  Jeff Cuthbert was promoted to the cabinet and Vaughan Gething and Ken Skates become junior ministers.

Alun Davies was sacked from the government on 8 July 2014, his responsibilities were temporarily restructured with some going to Rebecca Evans who joined the government as a junior minister. These responsibilities were further altered in a final significant reshuffle occurred on 11 September 2014 where Jeff Cuthbert, John Griffiths and Gwenda Thomas all left the government and Leighton Andrews returned to government while Julie James became a junior minister.

See also 
Members of the 4th National Assembly for Wales

References

Welsh governments
Ministries of Elizabeth II
2011 establishments in Wales
2016 disestablishments in Wales
Cabinets established in 2011
Cabinets disestablished in 2016